Occupy Berlin was a collaboration in Berlin, Germany that has included peaceful protests and demonstrations against unregulated financial markets and other alleged social injustices. It began as a part of the 15 October 2011 global protests. The protest began in solidarity with the Occupy Wall Street protests in New York, United States. It has established three encampments: outside the church Parochialkirche, in Boxhagener Platz and the biggest one on the Bundespressestrand.

Occupy Berlin cooperates with similar movements throughout Germany, most notably from Frankfurt and Hamburg.

As of June 2012, Occupy Berlin had continued to engage in organized meetings, events and actions.

Blockupy

See also

 List of Occupy movement protest locations

References

Further reading

External links
 Occupy Berlin activist group homepage
 AG Internationale Vernetzung homepage
 Occupy Berlin network and livestream 

2011 in Germany
2011 in Berlin
Berlin
Protests in Germany
Anti-austerity protests in the European Union